Félix del Canto (21 June 1893 – 29 January 1962) was a Mexican tennis player. He competed in the men's singles and doubles events at the 1924 Summer Olympics.

References

External links
 

1893 births
1962 deaths
Mexican male tennis players
Olympic tennis players of Mexico
Tennis players at the 1924 Summer Olympics
Sportspeople from Puebla
People from Puebla (city)
20th-century Mexican people